Kolejka may refer to:

 Kolejka (game)
 Kolejka, Opole Voivodeship